"Thank You" is a song written and performed by English singer-songwriter Dido. The song made its first appearance in 1998 on the soundtrack of the movie Sliding Doors. It was later included on Dido's 1999 debut album, No Angel, and was released in September 2000 to mainstream success. It was also sampled in the 2000 single "Stan" by Eminem, which helped propel "Thank You" and No Angel to mainstream success.

Entering the Billboard Hot 100 at number 80 in January 2001, "Thank You" peaked at number three in April 2001. It held that spot for three weeks and became Dido's first and only top-10 single in the United States. Additionally, the song reached number one on the Billboard Adult Contemporary, Adult Pop Songs, and Hot Dance Club Songs charts. In the United Kingdom, "Thank You" also reached number three, becoming the singer's third top-five single in the United Kingdom.

Song information
Dido wrote the song about the down times of depression and about how she lost her house. It remains Dido's biggest hit single in the United States to date, and her only one to reach the top 10 of the Billboard Hot 100. "Thank You" was one of the biggest sleeper hits of the year, debuting in January and remaining on the chart until the end of September. It spent 40 weeks on the chart, and in November Billboard published that "Thank You" finished as the seventh biggest song of the year.

The song's verses are written in the key of G minor whilst the chorus is in B Major, with a tempo of 80 beats per minute in common time. It follows a chord progression of GmEmaj7FBF/A, and Dido's vocals span from F3 to B4 in the song.

Critical reception
"Thank You" received acclaim from music critics, who thought the ballad was very "touching and soft" and an instant standout to the album. Jeff Burger from AllMusic had highlighted "Thank You" as an album standout. Christian Ward from NME wrote, Thank You', which, far from conjuring up images of lunatic fan-worship, is more reminiscent of the Corrs. Now that really is sick."

Music video
In the music video, Dido has not paid her bills, and the government comes to tear down her house. The police put an eviction notice on her door and movers start moving her belongings out. Dido, who seems oblivious to the fact that her house has been barricaded, is seen simply singing the song.

During the first chorus of the song, Dido has a cup of tea whilst movers pile her belongings by an outside wall, and a mover steps on flowers in her front yard. In the end, she is escorted out of her home, her home is demolished, she leaves behind most of her belongings, and walks away with just her shoulder bag and umbrella.

The end of the video implies that her house is actually being torn down for redevelopment, as her home is sandwiched between two large skyscrapers. The video was directed by Dave Meyers, and was released in January 2001. VEVO released an acoustic version of the song in December 2012, and a live concert version was released in August 2016.

Track listings

 UK CD single
 "Thank You" (album version) – 3:39
 "Thank You" (Deep Dish vocal) – 9:29
 "Thank You" (Skinny mix) – 3:20

 UK and US 12-inch single
A. "Thank You" (Deep Dish vocal) – 9:29
B. "Thank You" (Deep Dish dub) – 10:29 (10:40 on US pressings)

 UK cassette single and European CD single
 "Thank You" (album version) – 3:39
 "Thank You" (Deep Dish vocal) – 9:29

 European maxi-CD single
 "Thank You" (album version) – 3:39
 "Thank You" (Deep Dish vocal) – 9:29
 "Thank You" (Skinny mix) – 3:20
 "Thank You" (enhanced video version)

 US CD single
 "Thank You" (album version) – 3:39
 "Thank You" (Skinny remix) – 3:19
 "Thank You" (Deep Dish vocal) – 4:10
 "Thank You" (Deep Dish dub) – 10:40

Credits and personnel
Credits are lifted from the UK CD single liner notes and the No Angel album booklet.

Studios
 Recorded and mixed at The Church Studios (London, England)
 Mastered at Sterling Sound (New York City)

Personnel

 Dido – writing (as Dido Armstrong), all vocals, recorder production
 Paul Herman – writing, guitar
 Mark Bates – piano, keyboards
 Mal Hyde-Smith – percussion
 Rollo – production, programming
 Goetz – recording
 Phill Brown – mixing
 Tom Coyne – mastering
 Richard Andrews – artwork design
 Simon Emmett – photography

Charts and certifications

Weekly charts

Year-end charts

Certifications

Release history

Cover versions, remixes, and samples

Eminem's "Stan"
Eminem's critically acclaimed number-one single "Stan" samples the first verse of the song for its chorus. Dido herself appears in the music video for "Stan" (alongside Devon Sawa) as the pregnant girlfriend of the titular obsessed, suicidal and homicidal Eminem fan, and has made appearances on Eminem's tours to perform the song. When Eminem performed "Stan" live at the 2001 Grammy Awards, Elton John sang the Dido sample as he played keyboard during the performance. The sampling usage helped bring mainstream attention to "Thank You" and its parent album.

Deep Dish version
House music duo Deep Dish remixed the song. It won a Grammy Award for Best Remixed Recording in 2002.

Other notable versions
 In 2016, Rihanna sampled "Thank You" on her song "Never Ending" from her eighth album Anti.
 In 2016, Puerto Rican singers Kendo Kaponi and Anuel AA released the single "Me contagié", which covers the chorus of "Thank You" and partially adapted the lyrics in Spanish, sung by Anuel AA.
 In 2022, Peruvian DJ Tito Silva Music and singer Tefi C. released a parody of "Thank You" and "Stan" called "Mi bebito fiu fiu", related to an alleged case of infidelity of former President Martín Vizcarra. On 8 July 2022, Tito Silva took down his parody from his YouTube channel and streaming platforms at the behest of the copyright owners due to its political tone.

Legacy
In an interview on BBC Radio 3 in 2005, The Duchess of Kent, who worked as a classical music teacher after relinquishing royal duties, chose "Thank You" as one of her favourite pieces.

In April 2007, it was also voted number 57 in the BBC's list of the "Most Annoying Pop Songs We Hate to Love".

See also
 List of Billboard Adult Contemporary number ones of 2001

References

1990s ballads
1998 songs
2000 singles
2001 singles
Arista Records singles
Bertelsmann Music Group singles
Cheeky Records singles
Dido (singer) songs
Grammy Award for Best Remixed Recording, Non-Classical
Music videos directed by Dave Meyers (director)
Number-one singles in Portugal
Song recordings produced by Dido (singer)
Song recordings produced by Rollo Armstrong
Songs written by Dido (singer)